WBPI-CD (channel 49) is a low-power, Class A religious independent television station in Augusta, Georgia, United States, owned by Watchmen Broadcasting. The station's studios are located on Knox Avenue, and its transmitter is located on Bradley Drive, both in North Augusta, South Carolina.

Programming

The station has a religious evangelical Christian format and broadcasts a mix of locally produced and programs from other Christian television broadcasters and television ministries.

Locally produced programs include:
 Club 36, the station's flagship program, airing live for 2 hours every weeknight
 RocHouse Cafe music video and ministry show geared toward teenagers
 By The Book interview show with authors of Christian books

See also

Media in Augusta, Georgia

References

External links
 
 Faith brings couple to Christian broadcasting The Augusta Chronicle, January 3, 1998

BPI-CD
Religious television stations in the United States
Television channels and stations established in 1995
Low-power television stations in the United States
1995 establishments in Georgia (U.S. state)